Lázaro Martínez Despaigne (born November 11, 1962) is a retired Cuban sprinter who specialized in the 400 metres. He was born in La Lisa, Havana.

Martínez won an Olympic silver medal in 4 x 400 metres relay in Barcelona 1992. His personal best of 46.12 was set during the 1991 World Championships.

He has a daughter, Nathalie, with retired Cuban high jumper Silvia Costa. Nathalie Martínez is an able hurdler. His son is Abel Martinez Abreu who was born in Spain, with Ana E. Abreu Garcia.

References 
 

1962 births
Living people
Cuban male sprinters
Athletes (track and field) at the 1992 Summer Olympics
Olympic athletes of Cuba
Olympic silver medalists for Cuba
Athletes (track and field) at the 1983 Pan American Games
Athletes (track and field) at the 1987 Pan American Games
Athletes (track and field) at the 1991 Pan American Games
World Athletics Championships medalists
Pan American Games medalists in athletics (track and field)
Medalists at the 1992 Summer Olympics
Pan American Games gold medalists for Cuba
Pan American Games silver medalists for Cuba
Pan American Games bronze medalists for Cuba
Olympic silver medalists in athletics (track and field)
Universiade medalists in athletics (track and field)
World Athletics Championships athletes for Cuba
Central American and Caribbean Games gold medalists for Cuba
Competitors at the 1993 Central American and Caribbean Games
Universiade gold medalists for Cuba
Central American and Caribbean Games medalists in athletics
Medalists at the 1985 Summer Universiade
Medalists at the 1983 Pan American Games
Medalists at the 1987 Pan American Games
Medalists at the 1991 Pan American Games
Friendship Games medalists in athletics
20th-century Cuban people